Kyle Balda (born March 9, 1971) is an American animator and film director, best known for co-directing the Illumination films The Lorax (2012), with Chris Renaud; Minions (2015), with Pierre Coffin; and Minions: The Rise of Gru (2022), with Brad Ableson and Jonathan del Val. He previously worked as an animator for Industrial Light & Magic before moving to Pixar where he worked on three of their films.

Early life 
Balda was born in Tucson, Arizona, to a Maltese mother. He studied at the California Institute of the Arts in the early 1990s and dropped out after two years for a job he was offered.

Career 
During his time at CalArts, Balda was hired by LucasArts as an intern to create the animated opening credit sequence for the graphic adventure game Day of the Tentacle.

He started his career as an animator by working at Industrial Light & Magic, in films including The Mask as graphics animator, Jumanji as animation supervisor, and Mars Attacks! as character animator. He also worked at Weta Digital once in New Zealand, on the 1996 film The Frighteners, animating the character of the Grim Reaper for the film. Later Balda started working at Pixar; where he was credited as an additional animator in A Bug's Life, as directing animator in Toy Story 2, and as animator in Monsters, Inc.. In 2010, he joined Illumination Entertainment in Paris, and worked in Despicable Me as the head of layout. Balda has also directed several short films and lectured at different animation schools.

In 2012, Balda made his directorial debut at Illumination as co-director of The Lorax, along with Chris Renaud. The film was released domestically on March 2, 2012, by Universal Pictures and grossed over $348 million with a budget of $70 million.

In 2015, Balda directed another Illumination animated film, Minions, this time alongside Pierre Coffin. The film was released domestically on July 10, 2015, by Universal and has grossed over $1.1 billion.

In 2017, Balda co-directed Despicable Me 3. In his role as co-director he pushed for the film to have a more vibrant color palette than its predecessors.

Personal life 
Balda currently resides in the Oregon coast.

Filmography

Film

References

External links 
 

American animated film directors
Living people
Animators from Arizona
Film directors from Arizona
California Institute of the Arts alumni
Pixar people
Illumination (company) people
American people of Maltese descent
People from Tucson, Arizona
1971 births